Hugo Gómez Fernández (born 11 March 1948 in Bogota) is an actor of cinema and Colombian television.

Filmography

Television

Cinema

References

External links 
 Hugo Gómez in Colarte
 Path of Hugo Gómez
 Index card in RCN Television

Colombian male film actors
Colombian male television actors
Male actors from Bogotá
1948 births
Living people
20th-century Colombian male actors
21st-century Colombian male actors